Eagle Mountain (born 25 February 2004) is a British Thoroughbred racehorse who won the Hong Kong Cup and came second in the Epsom Derby.

Background
Eagle Mountain is owned by Sheikh Mohammed Bin Khalifa Al Maktoum. He was sired by seven-time group one winner Rock of Gibraltar and out of the mare Masskana.

Racing career
In his two-year-old season in 2006, Eagle Mountain won the Group 2 Beresford Stakes, finished second in the Futurity Stakes and Champagne Stakes, and finished fourth in the Racing Post Trophy.

As a three-year-old in 2007, he won the Group 2 Royal Whip Stakes, finished fifth in the 2000 Guineas, second in the Epsom Derby, third in the Irish Derby, second in the Champion Stakes, second in the York Stakes.

2008: Four-Year-Old Season
When he was a four-year-old, Eagle Mountain was sold and Mike De Kock trained him.

He then won the Group 3 Joel Stakes at Newmarket Racecourse, setting a new record for the fastest finish on the Rowley Mile course.

His next race was a second place finish in the Breeders' Cup Turf.

He went on to win the 2009 Hong Kong Cup by 1 lengths and then was retired. He had earned $3,521,721 in winnings.

Later career
In New Zealand, Eagle Mountain was found to be infertile, so returned to racing and came fifth in the 2009 Hong Kong Cup.

He came second in a race at Meydan Racecourse in February 2010, and injured his tendon while training after the race and retired in March.

All attempts at racing in New Zealand as an eight-year-old were unsuccessful.

References

2004 racehorse births
Racehorses trained in Ireland
Racehorses bred in the United Kingdom
Racehorses trained in South Africa
South African racehorses
Thoroughbred family 14-c